Jay Ira Kanter (born December 12, 1926) is an American film producer. He is best known for his long association with Alan Ladd Jr. He was a talent agent at MCA for a number of years. He is known for his biographical works such as Grace Kelly: The American Princess (1987) and Brando (2007). His most recent work is Marlon Brando: An Actor Named Desire (2014).

Personal life 
Kanter was born to a Jewish family in Chicago, Illinois. He was married to Judy Balaban (daughter of Barney Balaban) from 1953 until they divorced in 1961. Then he was married to Kit Bennett from 1965 until her death in 2014. He has two daughters with Balaban, Amy and Victoria.

Select Credits 
 Villain (1971) - producer
 Fear is the Key (1972) - producer

References

External links 
 
 Jay Kanter at TCMDB

1926 births
Living people
Film producers from Illinois
20th-century American Jews
People from Chicago
Balaban family
21st-century American Jews